Hemigymnus sexfasciatus, the Red Sea thicklip wrasse is a species of marine ray-finned fish from the family Labridae, the wrasses.

References

sexfasciatus
Fish described in 1835